Creston-Kenilworth is a neighborhood in the Southeast section of Portland, Oregon, lying between SE 26th Ave. on the west and SE Foster Rd. (to SE 61st Ave.) on the east, and between SE Powell Blvd. on the north and SE Holgate Blvd. on the south.  It is adjacent to the neighborhoods of Brooklyn to the west, Hosford-Abernethy, and Richmond to the north, Foster-Powell and Mt. Scott-Arleta to the east, and Reed and Woodstock to the south.

Parks include Creston Park (1920) and Kenilworth Park (1909).

According to Portland Parks & Recreation, the Kenilworth neighborhood was platted in 1889 and is "named after Sir Walter Scott's 1821 novel Kenilworth, a romantic novel set in Elizabethan England. Many of the streets in the neighborhood took their names from this novel and other novels by Scott."

References

External links
 
 Guide to Creston-Kenilworth Neighborhood (PortlandNeighborhood.com)
Creston-Kenilworth Street Tree Inventory Report

 
Neighborhoods in Portland, Oregon